The Poet Laureate of Georgia is the poet laureate for the U.S. state of Georgia. The position was created in 1925 by proclamation of the governor. The position was codified with the Georgia Council for the Arts providing a list of three nominees for the governor's selection at the start of term.

List of Poets laureate
The following have held the position:
 Frank Lebby Stanton (1925–1927)
 Ernest Neal (1927–1943)
 Wightman F. Melton (1943–1944) 
 Oliver F. Reeves (1944–1963) 
 Agnes C. Bramblett (1963–1973) 
 Conrad Aiken (1973)
 John R. Lewis, Jr. (1974–1997) 
 Bettie Mixon Sellers (1997–2000)
 David Bottoms (2000–2012)
 Judson Mitcham (2012–2019)
 Chelsea Rathburn (2019–present)

See also

 Poet laureate
 List of U.S. states' poets laureate
 United States Poet Laureate

References

External links
Chelsea Rathburn (incumbent)
Poets Laureate of Georgia at the Library of Congress

 
Symbols of Georgia (U.S. state)
American Poets Laureate